Abachrysa is a genus of green lacewings in the family Chrysopidae. There is one described species in Abachrysa, Abachrysa eureka.

References

Further reading

 
 
 

Chrysopidae
Articles created by Qbugbot
Neuroptera genera
Monotypic Neuroptera genera